Richard Alan Beirach (born 23 May 1947) is an American jazz pianist and composer.

Early life
Beirach was born in New York City. He initially studied both classical music and jazz. While still attending high school, he took lessons from pianist Lennie Tristano. Beirach later entered the Berklee College of Music. After one year, he left Berklee and began attending the Manhattan School of Music. While there, he studied with Ludmilla Ulehla. In 1972, he graduated from the Manhattan School of Music with a Master's Degree in Music Theory and Composition.

Career
In 1972 Beirach began working with Stan Getz. He also worked with Chet Baker. Beirach has maintained an ongoing musical partnership with David Liebman from the late-1960s to the present in the groups Lookout Farm and Quest. In addition, Liebman and Beirach have frequently performed and recorded as a duo.

Several of Beirach's compositions – "Leaving" and "Elm", for instance – have found their way into the jazz standard repertoire.

Playing style
Beirach's style is influenced by Art Tatum, Bill Evans, McCoy Tyner, Chick Corea and his earlier classical training. It is also individualistic with many touches all its own.

Discography

As leader/co-leader

As a member
Quest
 Quest (Trio, 1982) – recorded in 1981
 Quest II (Storyville, 1986) - Live
 Midpoint: Quest III (Storyille, 1988)
 N.Y. Nites: Standards (PAN Music/NEC Avenue, 1988)
 Natural Selection (Pathfinder/NEC Avenue, 1988)
 Of One Mind (CMP, 1990)
 Redemption; Quest Live in Europe (Hatology, 2007) - Live
 Re-Dial - Live In Hamburg (Outnote, 2007) - Live
 Circular Dreaming (enja, 2012) - recorded in 2011

As sideman
With George Adams
 Sound Suggestions (ECM, 1979)
With John Abercrombie
 Arcade (ECM, 1978)
 Abercrombie Quartet (ECM, 1979)
 M (ECM, 1980)
With John Scofield
 John Scofield Live (Enja, 1978)
With Chet Baker
You Can't Go Home Again (Horizon, 1977) 
The Best Thing for You (A&M, 1977 [1989])
With Frank Tusa
Father Time (Enja, 1975)
With Dave Liebman
First Visit (album) (Philips, 1973)
Lookout Farm (ECM, 1973)
Sweet Hands (Horizon, 1975)
Light'n Up, Please! (Horizon, 1976)
Pendulum (Artists House, 1978)
Eternal Voices (Jazzline, 2019)
With Jeremy Steig
Temple of Birth (Columbia, 1975)
 Firefly (CTI, 1977)
With Steve Davis
 Explorations and Impressions (Double-Time, 1997)
With Laurie Antonioli
 The Duo Session (Nabel, 2005)
With Ron McClure Trio
 Inspiration (Ken, 1991)
With George Mraz
 Catching Up (1991)
 My Foolish Heart (1995)
 Jazz (1995)

References

External links
Richie Beirach's Website
Richie Beirach at AllAboutJazz.com

1947 births
American jazz pianists
American male pianists
Berklee College of Music alumni
ECM Records artists
Living people
Musicians from New York City
Post-bop pianists
20th-century American pianists
Jazz musicians from New York (state)
21st-century American pianists
20th-century American male musicians
21st-century American male musicians
American male jazz musicians
Quest (band) members
Sunnyside Records artists
SteepleChase Records artists
ACT Music artists
Origin Records artists